Pentascyphus is a genus of flowering plants belonging to the family Sapindaceae.

Its native range is French Guiana to Northern and Northeastern Brazil.

Species:
 Pentascyphus thyrsiflorus Radlk.

References

Sapindaceae
Sapindaceae genera